Shegomoc is a Canadian rural community in York County, New Brunswick.

The community is located on the east side of the Saint John River of Route 2.

History

Notable people

  Roland H. Hartley 10th Governor of Washington United States was born here.

See also
List of communities in New Brunswick

References

Populated places established in 1862
Communities in York County, New Brunswick
1862 establishments in New Brunswick